Guido Fanti (27 May 1925 – 11 February 2012) was an Italian politician. From 1979–1989 he served as a Member of the European Parliament (MEP). He was a member of the Italian Communist Party.

Biography
Fanti was born in 1925. He enrolled at the university but was forced to leave it during the Second World War. He was called to arms in 1943 but soon joined the partisan resistance. In 1945, after the liberation of Bologna, he joined the Italian Communist Party. He became provincial secretary of the PCI fifteen years later. In 1960 he also entered the central committee of the party, where he was reconfirmed in the following two congresses, and in 1965, at the XI congress, a member of the national directorate.

Fanti was elected city councilor of Bologna in 1957;  on 2 April 1966 he was elected mayor of the city, when Giuseppe Dozza resigned for health reasons, after having brought the semi-destroyed city from war to reconstruction, and the economic and social recovery started. During his mandate, the PEEP public housing plan and the construction of the "Fiera District" (based on a project by architect Kenzō Tange) were approved.

On 29 July 1970 Guido Fanti resigned from office because he was elected the first president of the Emilia-Romagna Region. He then renounced his regional mandate as he was a member of the Chamber of Deputies from 1976 to 1983. In 1983 he was elected senator of the IX legislature and remained in office until 1987. From 1979 to 1989 he was a member of the European Parliament, of which he became vice president in 1984.

Guido Fanti died in the night between 10 and 11 February 2012.

References

1925 births
2012 deaths
MEPs for Italy 1979–1984
MEPs for Italy 1984–1989
Politicians from Bologna
Italian Communist Party MEPs
Italian Communist Party politicians
Deputies of Legislature VII of Italy
Deputies of Legislature VIII of Italy
Senators of Legislature IX of Italy